Vladimir Sergeyevich Bushin (24 January 1924 – 25 December 2019) was a Russian writer, essayist, literary critic, columnist and social activist. Bushin was born in Glukhovo, Bogorodsky Uyezd, Moscow Governorate, RSFSR, USSR, and was a member of the Union of Soviet Writers and Communist. He was one of the signers of the Russian nationalist pamphlet called .

References

External links
 Владимир Бушин. Выступление на VII съезде писателей России.

1924 births
2019 deaths
People from Noginsk
People from Bogorodsky Uyezd
Communist Party of the Soviet Union members
Soviet journalists
Russian male journalists
Russian journalists
Soviet writers
20th-century Russian writers
Soviet military personnel of World War II
Maxim Gorky Literature Institute alumni